The Lagos National Stadium is a multi-purpose stadium in Surulere, Lagos State, Nigeria, which comprises an Olympic-size swimming arena and a multipurpose arena used for athletics, rugby, basketball, volleyball, table tennis, wrestling and boxing matches.  It was used mostly for football matches until 2004. It hosted several international competitions including the 1980 African Cup of Nations final, the 2000 African Cup of Nations final, and FIFA World Cup qualifying matches. It also served as the main stadium for the 1973 All-Africa Games.

History
When the stadium was built in 1972, it had a capacity of 55,000. The capacity was then reduced to 45,000 in 1999. The record attendance is 85,000 and was taken in the final match of the African Cup of Nations in 1980 between Nigeria and Algeria.

Its 50-meter pool was closed in 1999.

For unknown reasons, the National Stadium had been left to dilapidate since the early 2000s. It last hosted a national team game in 2004, with football matches moved to the nearby Teslim Balogun Stadium. It is now occasionally used for religious gatherings and has been taken over by area boys and squatters. In 2009, the National Sports Commission begun a concerted effort to bring the facility back to world class status.

Notable football events

1980 African Cup of Nations

1999 FIFA World Youth Championship

2000 African Cup of Nations

See also
List of stadiums in Nigeria

References

External links
Photos of Stadiums in Nigeria at cafe.daum.net/stade
Photos at fussballtempel.net

Sports venues completed in 1972
Football venues in Nigeria
Nigeria
Stadiums of the African Games
Sport in Lagos
Multi-purpose stadiums in Nigeria
Sports venues in Lagos
20th-century architecture in Nigeria